Monteroni d'Arbia is a comune (municipality) in the Province of Siena in the Italian region Tuscany, located about  south of Florence and about  southeast of Siena in the area known as the Crete Senesi. It takes its names from the Arbia torrent, a tributary of the Ombrone River.

Main sights
The pieve of Saint John the Baptist, at Corsano, dates from before 1031. With a nave and two aisles, it is an example of Romanesque architecture with Pisan and Lombard influences. It houses two canvasses by Alessandro Casolari.

The church of Saints James and Christopher in Cuna, has remains of 14th-century frescoes.

People
Cesare Maccari, painter, lived in the hamlet of Quinciano

References

External links

 Official website

Crete Senesi